Sir Norman Stanley Alexander  (7 October 1907 – 26 March 1997) was a New Zealand physicist instrumental in the establishment of many Commonwealth universities, including Ahmadu Bello University in Nigeria, and the Universities of the West Indies, the South Pacific and Botswana, Lesotho and Swaziland. He was knighted in 1966.

Early life
Alexander was born in Te Awamutu, New Zealand. Alexander was one of eight children of farmers whose ancestors were immigrants from the United Kingdom and Denmark. 
  
Alexander took his early education at Hamilton Boys' High School before moving to the University of Auckland to study physics, graduating with a Bachelor of Science with first class honours in 1927. In 1930, Alexander achieved a two-year scholarship to Trinity College, Cambridge to study physics at the Cavendish Laboratory with Ernest Rutherford.

World War II

He was imprisoned in Changi Prison in 1942, and word made its way to New Zealand that he had died, when he was in fact alive.  Using his academic knowledge, Alexander helped to build a salt evaporation plant at Changi and a small industrial plant that fermented surgical spirit and other products for the prison hospital. After his release he eventually headed a New Zealand commission of investigation into abuses at Sime Road Internment Camp.

Career summary

 Physics lecturer at Auckland University College
 1930 – won the Commonwealth scholarship to Trinity College, Cambridge.
 1936–49 Professor of Physics, Raffles College, Singapore.
 1949–52 Dean of Science, University of Malaya
 1952–58 Professor of Physics and Vice-president, University College, Ibadan, Nigeria
 1958–60 Professor of Engineering Physics, Middle East Technical University, Ankara, Turkey
 1961–66 Vice Chancellor, Ahmadu Bello University, Nigeria
 1966  University of the West Indies
 1966–68 Vice Chancellor University of the South Pacific, Laucala Bay, Fiji
 1970 – Advisor: UK Ministry of Overseas Development, Inter-University Council for Higher Education Overseas, London University School of Oriental and African Studies

Personal life
Alexander was married to noted meteorologist Frances Elizabeth Somerville Alexander née Caldwell and have three children William (1937), Mary (1939) and Bernice (1941).

Awards and honours
Alexander was promoted to Commander of the Order of the British Empire in the 1959 Birthday Honours, and was knighted in March 1966.

References

1907 births
1997 deaths
New Zealand physicists
Academic staff of the University of New Zealand
University of New Zealand alumni
People from Te Awamutu
New Zealand expatriates in England
New Zealand expatriates in British Malaya
New Zealand expatriates in Nigeria
New Zealand expatriates in Fiji
New Zealand expatriates in Turkey